The octave mandolin (US and Canada) or octave mandola (Ireland and UK) is a fretted string instrument with four pairs of strings tuned in fifths, G−D−A−E (low to high), an octave below a mandolin. It is larger than the mandola, but smaller than the mandocello and its construction is similar to other instruments in the mandolin family. Usually the courses are all unison pairs but the lower two may sometimes be strung as octave pairs with the higher-pitched octave string on top so that it is hit before the thicker lower-pitched string. Alternate tunings of G−D−A−D and A−D−A−D are often employed by Celtic musicians.

Terminology
The names of the mandolin family instruments vary between Europe and the United States. The instruments that are known in the US as the mandola and the octave mandolin tend to be known in Great Britain and Ireland as the tenor mandola, the octave mandola (or the "Irish bouzouki"). Also, octave mandola is sometimes applied to what in the U.S. is a mandocello.

In Europe outside the British isles, mandola is the larger G−D−A−E tuned instrument while the smaller C−G−D−A tuned one is known as alt-mandoline (i.e., alto mandolin), mandoliola or liola.

This geographic distinction is not crisp, and there are cases of each term being used in each country. Jimmy Moon, a Scottish luthier, calls his version of the instrument by both names; Paul Shippey, an English luthier, uses the term "octave mandolin". Confusion will likely continue as the terms continue to be used interchangeably.

Construction

Mandolin body
Octave mandolin construction is similar to the mandolin: The body may be constructed with a bowl-shaped back according to designs of the 18th century Vinaccia school, or with a flat (arched) back according to the designs of Gibson Guitar Corporation, popularized in the United States in the early 20th century.

The internal bracing is similar to the mandolin and mandola, with a single transverse brace on the top just below the oval sound hole. On modern instruments X-bracing is sometimes used.

As is typical of the mandolin family, octave mandolins can be found with either a single oval soundhole or a pair of " " soundholes. As with the scale length, the number of frets on an octave mandolin also varies widely, from as few as 17 to as many as 24 frets: 18 or 19 frets is typical.

Guitar body
From the mid-20th century on, a number of makers have produced octave mandolins with guitar-shaped (e.g., the "hourglass" or "figure 8") bodies. These instruments are typically constructed essentially like acoustic guitars, with similar woods and internal bracing. The neck, however, is much narrower, and supports the mandolin string layout, rather than the traditional 6 strings of the guitar.

Layout of strings
As with the mandolin and mandola, the octave mandolin has four courses of two strings each. The two strings in each course are tuned in unison.  Alternate tunings exist in which the strings in some courses are tuned to octaves, rather than unisons, but this is more typical of the Irish Bouzouki.

Tuning and range
Usually, courses of 2 adjacent strings are doubled (tuned to the same pitch). The standard octave mandolin tuning is GG−DD−AA−EE, so the lowest open strings are tuned to the lowest G on the guitar, and the highest strings are tuned to the same E as the highest string of the guitar. This tuning is one octave below the mandolin (or a fourth below the mandola), and is equivalent to that of the tenor violin:

 fourth (lowest tone) course: G ( Hz)
 third course: D ( Hz)
 second course: A ( Hz)
 first (highest tone) course: E ( Hz)

Usage
Octave mandolins are sometimes used in mandolin orchestras in place of mandolas. The mandolinists thus avoid learning to read music on the alto clef; music for the octave mandolin is usually written on the more familiar treble clef, and plays an octave lower than the notes shown (see octave clefs).

See also

 Irish bouzouki
 Mandocello
 Mando-bass
 Stringed instrument tunings

Bibliography

References

External links

 Octave mandolin at Banjolin gives an explanation of why Europeans use the term "octave mandola".
 John McGann on Octave Mandolin John McGann, author of Guide to Octave Mandolin and Bouzouki proposes standardized terminology, and discusses a variety of issues on playing the octave mandolin.
 theMandolinTuner, a mandolin site focusing on mandolin tuning, chords and tabs

Mandolin family instruments